The 1982 Florida subtropical storm, officially known as Subtropical Storm One, was the only subtropical cyclone of the exceptionally inactive 1982 Atlantic hurricane season. The storm originated from two different systems around the Gulf of Mexico and Caribbean on June 16. The systems merged into trough while a circulation began to form off the coast of Florida on June 18. The depression made landfall in Florida and strengthened into a storm over land. The storm entered the Atlantic Ocean and headed to the northeast, becoming extratropical on June 20 near Newfoundland. The storm was the only system of 1982 to affect the eastern half of the United States, and it caused three fatalities and caused $10 million in damage (1982 USD, $21 million 2007 USD).

Meteorological history

The subtropical storm had an unusual origin by forming from an interaction of two different systems near the Yucatán Peninsula. This occurrence is unusual, but not unique, as Subtropical Storm One in the 1974 season formed in similar pattern. A reconnaissance flight on June 17 reported that there appeared to be multiple transient circulations at the surface, but no well-defined center. The first disturbance can be traced back to June 15 in the northwest Caribbean. The disturbance moved north, along with a low-pressure area that formed over the Yucatán Peninsula. A trough merged with the low-pressure area creating an even stronger trough over the eastern Gulf of Mexico. Conditions in the Gulf of Mexico were favorable for tropical storm formation. Some severe weather had been occurring over the Florida Peninsula as early as June 16, as the fringes of disturbance moved across the Florida Straits and over the Peninsula.

A circulation began to form on June 18 in the eastern Gulf of Mexico, prompting gale warnings. It was declared Subtropical Depression One the same day. The depression made landfall on the morning of June 18 just north of Spring Hill, Florida and gained subtropical storm status over land. The storm was classified as Subtropical Storm One by the National Hurricane Center, as the rule was not to name subtropical storms. The subtropical storm moved to the northeast and crossed the Outer Banks of North Carolina on June 19. Even though the minimum central pressures remained low, the circulation expanded and became distorted. The subtropical storm peaked at 70 mph winds (110 km/h) on June 18, but did not reach its minimum pressure until June 20, when it dropped to 984 mbar (29.07 inHg). The subtropical storm was declared an extratropical storm near the Canadian Maritimes, on the same day.

Preparations
Several warnings were issued in association with the subtropical storm. On June 16, severe thunderstorm watches and warnings were issued for Florida. The next day, more warnings were issued, including tornado, small craft, and special marine warnings. There were also various types of special weather statements issued for heavy rains. Five gale warnings were issued on June 18 and June 19 for the cities on the western coast of Florida. All warnings were discontinued by 12 p.m. EDT (1600 UTC) June 19. The same day, a gale warning was issued from Cape Henlopen, Delaware to Watch Hill, Rhode Island.

The subtropical storm postponed the bi-annual Newport, Rhode Island to Bermuda sailboat race for two consecutive days due to the forecast one of the storm. Subsequent reports from sailboats said that with the track of the storm, if not for the delay, there would have been a marine disaster.

Impact
In its main inflow band over Cuba, rainfall amounts up to 28.66 inches (728 mm) were recorded.

Most of the storm's effects were felt in Florida where it made landfall on the morning of June 18, causing gales, heavy rains, flooding, beach erosion and tornadoes. Rainfall peaked at 10.72 inches (272.28 mm) in Desoto City, while much of the rest of the state reported between 1–5 inches (25–125 inches) of precipitation. High tides and waves caused flooding and beach erosion from Naples to the Tampa Bay area. Some waterfront buildings suffered damage from undermining including widespread damage of marinas and some boats. Several bulkheads and rock revetments experienced minor damage in Naples and Marco Island. Several man‑made dune structures seaward of the Coastal Construction Control Line in Collier County received minor damage at Vanderbilt Beach and Marco Island. Three people were killed in Florida in association with the subtropical storm with a further thirteen people injured. A Brevard County woman died when a canoe overturned and an Orange County child was killed when he was swept into a drainage ditch. 130 families were evacuated a few days after the storm from the Arcadia River area because the Peace River crested above flood stage.

The subtropical storm spawned twelve tornadoes across Florida, including at least 2 tornadoes which reached a magnitude of F2 on the Fujita Scale. The first tornado formed in Hendry County on June 18 at 0115 UTC reaching F2 strength. The third fatality was a man from Hendry County who was killed in his mobile home, which was destroyed by a tornado. A total of twenty-five homes in Florida were destroyed. Total damage in Florida totaled out to $10 million (1982 USD, $21 million 2007 USD).

The storm's effects north of Florida were minor. Rainfall reached up to nine inches (228 mm) in extreme eastern South Carolina and four inches (101 mm) in eastern North Carolina. A 68-foot fishing trawler sunk off the coast of Cape Fear in North Carolina from the high waves; no one was killed as the sailors were rescued by the United States Coast Guard on June 19. Flooding was reported with tides of two to three feet in the Carolinas. Rainfall from the subtropical storm reached both states, reaching maximum peaks of up to five inches (127 mm) on the Georgia coast and seven inches on the Georgia/South Carolina border. Rainfall totaled to about one inch (25 mm) on the Virginian coast. A ship encountered winds of a minimum tropical storm with gusts as high as a maximum tropical storm. The ship also encountered a tidal surge of 15 to 20 feet.

See also 

Subtropical cyclone
1982 Atlantic hurricane season
List of Atlantic hurricanes
 Timeline of the 1982 Atlantic hurricane season
 List of North Carolina hurricanes (1980–1999)

References

External links
 Detailed information on all storms from 1982

Subtropical storms
1982 Atlantic hurricane season
1982 Florida
1982 Florida
1982 Florida
1982 Florida
1982 Florida
Subtropical Storm One
1982 natural disasters in the United States
1982 Florida subtropical storm